Platylister is a genus of clown beetles belonging to the family Histeridae.

Species

 Platylister abruptus
 Platylister alexandri
 Platylister algiricus
 Platylister andamanensis
 Platylister angolensis
 Platylister arcuatus
 Platylister atratus
 Platylister bimarginatus
 Platylister birmanus
 Platylister bonvouloiri
 Platylister borneolus
 Platylister cambodjensis
 Platylister canalicollis
 Platylister castetsi
 Platylister cathayi
 Platylister cavicauda
 Platylister charrali
 Platylister comes
 Platylister confucii
 Platylister congoensis
 Platylister contiguus
 Platylister corticinus
 Platylister cribropygus
 Platylister dahdah
 Platylister decipiens
 Platylister densatus
 Platylister desinens
 Platylister diffusus
 Platylister doriae
 Platylister emptus
 Platylister enodis
 Platylister fallaciosus
 Platylister foliaceus
 Platylister foveolatus
 Platylister friederichsi
 Platylister frontosus
 Platylister habitus
 Platylister hatamensis
 Platylister horni
 Platylister humilis
 Platylister insuliculus
 Platylister jobiensis
 Platylister kempi
 Platylister lignarius
 Platylister lucifigus
 Platylister luzonicus
 Platylister maculatus
 Platylister makassariensis
 Platylister malaicus
 Platylister murrayi
 Platylister nemoralis
 Platylister oberthuri
 Platylister odiosus
 Platylister ovatus
 Platylister pacificus
 Platylister palonensis
 Platylister patruus
 Platylister perroudi
 Platylister persimilis
 Platylister pini
 Platylister placitus
 Platylister pluvialis
 Platylister podagrus
 Platylister querulus
 Platylister ramoicola
 Platylister roberstorfi
 Platylister rosselensis
 Platylister sarawakensis
 Platylister sexstriatus
 Platylister simeani
 Platylister soronensis
 Platylister sororius
 Platylister strangulatus
 Platylister strialis
 Platylister striatiderus
 Platylister sulcisternus
 Platylister sumatrensis
 Platylister suturalis
 Platylister tenuimargo
 Platylister timoriensis
 Platylister unicus
 Platylister vanus

References

Histeridae